João de Almeida Bruno (30 July 1935 – 10 August 2022) was a Portuguese military judge.

Almeida died in Lisbon on 10 August 2022, at the age of 87.

References

1935 births
2022 deaths
Portuguese judges
People from Lisbon